Hugh Henry Bownes (March 10, 1920 – November 5, 2003) was an American federal judge in the United States, serving as a United States circuit judge of the United States Court of Appeals for the First Circuit, after previously serving as a United States District Judge of the United States District Court for the District of New Hampshire.

Education and career

Born in New York City, New York, Bownes graduated from Columbia College with a Bachelor of Arts degree in 1941, and after serving in the United States Marine Corps during World War II, graduated from Columbia Law School with a Bachelor of Laws in 1948. Bownes then moved to New Hampshire, where he practiced law for more than 15 years. He served as a city council member and then as mayor of Laconia, New Hampshire. In 1966, he was selected as a member of the Superior Court of New Hampshire, on which he served for two years.

Military service

Bownes participated in the invasion of Guam. Wounded by mortar fire, he developed gangrene and nearly died. For his service, he received the Silver Star and Purple Heart.

Federal judicial service

Bownes was nominated by President Lyndon B. Johnson on July 17, 1968, to a seat on the United States District Court for the District of New Hampshire vacated by Judge Aloysius Joseph Connor. He was confirmed by the United States Senate on July 25, 1968, and received commission on July 25, 1968. His service terminated on October 31, 1977, due to elevation to the First Circuit.

Bownes was nominated by President Jimmy Carter on September 19, 1977, to a seat on the United States Court of Appeals for the First Circuit vacated by Judge Edward McEntee. He was confirmed by the Senate on October 7, 1977, and received commission on October 11, 1977. He assumed senior status on January 1, 1990. His service terminated on November 5, 2003, due to his death from pneumonia in New Haven, Connecticut. He had suffered a stroke in September of that year.

References

Sources
 
 Columbia College Obituary (see under "1941")
 New Hampshire Bar Association Obituary 

1920 births
2003 deaths
Columbia Law School alumni
New Hampshire state court judges
Mayors of places in New Hampshire
People from Laconia, New Hampshire
Judges of the United States District Court for the District of New Hampshire
United States district court judges appointed by Lyndon B. Johnson
Judges of the United States Court of Appeals for the First Circuit
United States court of appeals judges appointed by Jimmy Carter
20th-century American judges
New Hampshire city council members
United States Marine Corps personnel of World War II
New Hampshire lawyers
Superior court judges in the United States
Columbia College (New York) alumni